Muhteşem Yüzyıl: Kösem is a Turkish television sequel to the 2011 Turkish television period drama Muhteşem Yüzyıl. Written by Yılmaz Şahin, it recounts the life of Mahpeyker Kösem Sultan, a slave girl who became the most powerful woman in Ottoman history after she was captured and sent to the harem of Sultan Ahmed I. Actresses Nurgül Yeşilçay, Beren Saat and Anastasia Tsilimpiou played the titular role in three different ages of her life, while actors Ekin Koç, Boran Kuzum, Taner Ölmez, Metin Akdülger and Tugay Mercan were cast as different sultans of the Ottoman dynasty. Also in the starring cast were actresses Hülya Avşar, Tülin Özen, Leyla Feray, Farah Zeynep Abdullah, Aslıhan Gürbüz and Hande Doğandemir, who played prominent roles of different sultanas in the series.

The first few episodes of the series were filmed in Chios, Greece. An excerpt of the show was screened in Cannes, France, at the annual international television festival MIPCOM about a month before its official premiere on Star TV on November 12, 2015. It was later transferred to FOX for its second season. Since its broadcast, Muhteşem Yüzyıl: Kösem has been aired in several countries.
 
Its final episode aired on 27 June 2017. The series' finale marked the end of the six-year Muhteşem Yüzyıl saga.

Synopsis 
The series follows the life of Kösem Sultan, from the time she was brought as a slave into the harem of Ahmed I through her rise to power as Haseki Sultan, then as Valide Sultan to her sons Murad IV and Ibrahim, as well as her grandson Mehmed IV.

Series overview

Characters

The Imperial Family

Statesmen and palace officials

Palace servants and concubines

Otherwise associated to the palace

International broadcasts

See also
 List of Islam-related films

References

External links

 
 Muhteşem Yüzyıl: Kösem – Official Website
 Muhteşem Yüzyıl: Kösem at FOX
 Muhteşem Yüzyıl: Kösem Official YouTube channel

2015 Turkish television series debuts
2017 Turkish television series endings
Television series about the Ottoman Empire
Television series set in the 17th century
Fox (Turkish TV channel) original programming
Star TV (Turkey) original programming
Turkish drama television series
Television series about Islam
Turkish historical television series
Television series produced in Istanbul
Television shows set in Istanbul